Rumble in the Bronx (Chinese title: 紅番區, Hong Faan Kui (transl. Red Turn District) is a 1995 American-Hong Kong martial arts film starring Jackie Chan, Anita Mui and Françoise Yip. It was directed by Stanley Tong, with action choreographed by Chan and Tong. Released in Hong Kong in 1995, Rumble in the Bronx had a successful worldwide theatrical run, and brought Chan into the North American mainstream. The film is set in the Bronx area of New York City, but was filmed in and around Vancouver, Canada. The film grossed  worldwide against a  budget, making it the most profitable film of 1996.

Plot
Ma Hon Keung (馬漢強, Mǎ Hànqiáng), a Hong Kong cop, comes to New York to attend the wedding of his Uncle Bill, who introduces him to his American wife Whitney at his supermarket, which he has sold to Elaine. Uncle Bill's friend, Steven Lo, loans him a vintage automobile for the wedding. That night, a street gang starts a motorcycle race near Uncle Bill's apartment. They are about to run over his friend's car until Keung jumps down and stops them.

He soon starts a rivalry with the gang after driving them away from Elaine's supermarket, which they tried to rob and vandalize. A series of brawls breaks out in which the bikers try to corner Keung and finish him off. When a member named Angelo gets involved in an illegal diamond deal gone bad and steals the diamonds, the small-time gangsters become the victims of a larger and more effective criminal syndicate led by White Tiger. While running away with the diamonds, Angelo leaves them in a cushion, which is unknowingly used by Keung for the wheelchair of a disabled Chinese American boy named Danny. Danny's elder sister Nancy, a lingerie model/dancer, works in a seedy bar and is an associate/girlfriend of the bikers.

Keung befriends Nancy and advises her to stay away from crime. When the gangsters see this, they chase Keung and Nancy. After failing to confront Keung, the bikers trash Elaine's supermarket, during which two of Angelo's men are captured by White Tiger's men, who turn up at the supermarket in search of Angelo. Angelo's colleagues are unaware of his diamond heist and one is executed in a tree-shredder; his remains given back to the other gangsters as a warning to return the multimillion-dollar goods. In the meantime, Keung and Nancy go to the bikers' headquarters after the latest supermarket attack, and Keung defeats them in another brawl.

Keung agrees to help the biker leader Tony, convinces the street gangsters to reform, and brings the big-time criminals to justice. The syndicate and Keung discover the diamonds in Danny's wheelchair. The handover is botched after Nancy and Tony are held hostage by the syndicate and the diamonds are lost after they use a tow truck to destroy Elaine's supermarket. White Tiger's men hijack a hovercraft and are pursued by Keung and the New York Police Department in the Hudson River. The hovercraft ends up running through the streets, causing much damage to property. 

Keung ends the chase by stealing a large sword from a museum, clamping it onto a sports car window and driving into the hovercraft, shredding the rubber skirt and crashing the vehicle. After shooting one of the syndicate men non-fatally to force them to reveal White Tiger's location, Keung drives the repaired hovercraft to a golf course where White Tiger is playing with subordinates. He runs them over, leaving White Tiger naked on the ground.

Cast
 Jackie Chan as Ma Hon Keung (T: 馬漢強, S: 马汉强, P: Mǎ Hànqiáng)
 Anita Mui as Elaine
 Françoise Yip as Nancy
 Bill Tung as Uncle Bill Ma (T: 馬 驃, S: 马 骠, J: maa5 piu3, P: Mǎ Piào)
 Marc Akerstream as Tony, leader of the gang
 Garvin Cross as Angelo
 Morgan Lam as Danny
 Kris Lord as White Tiger, the syndicate boss
 Carrie Cain Sparks as Whitney Ma
 Elliot Ngok (Yueh Hua) as Walter Wah, the Realtor (T: 華, S: 华) (credited as Elly Leung)
 Eddy Ko as Prospective market buyer
 Emil Chau as Ice cream salesman
 Alex To as Ice cream customer
 Jordan Lennox as Jordan, a syndicate member with glasses
 John Sampson as a syndicate member
 Richard Faraci as a syndicate member with a ponytail who Keung subdues in Danny's apartment
 Gabriel Ostevic as Gabriel, a syndicate member with a mustache who Keung knocks in the water in the boathouse
 Terry Howsen as a syndicate member in a black suit
 Mark Fielding as a syndicate member run over by the hovercraft at the golf course
 Owen Walstrom as a syndicate member flying into a tree at the golf course
 Allen Sit as one of Tony's gang members with a mustache and ponytail, who speaks Cantonese in the supermarket and is the first one who Keung physically confronts
 Alf Humphreys as a Police Officer

Production

In  his autobiography, I am Jackie Chan: My life in Action, Jackie Chan talked about the initial difficulty of filming a movie in Vancouver that is set in New York. The production team initially had to put up fake graffiti during the day and take it all down during the evening, while simultaneously making sure that no mountains made it into the background. However, Chan decided that it was best that the production team focus on the action only without worrying too much about scenery. In his review, Roger Ebert notes that there are mountains in the background, which are not present in the NYC landscape. There is also an NYC helicopter which displays a Canadian civil registration (C-GZPM - A Bell JetRanger).

The original spoken dialogue consisted of all of the actors speaking their native language most of the time. In the completely undubbed soundtrack, available on the Warner Japanese R2 DVD release, Jackie Chan actually speaks his native Cantonese while Françoise Yip and Morgan Lam (the actors playing Nancy and Danny) speak English. All of the original dialogue was intended to be dubbed over in the international and Hong Kong film markets, and New Line cinema overdubbed and slightly changed the original English dialogue.

During filming, Chan broke his right ankle while performing a stunt. He spent much of the remaining shooting time with one foot in a cast. When it came to the film's climax, the crew colored a sock to resemble the shoe on his good foot, which Chan wore over his cast. His foot still had not completely healed when he went on to shoot his next film, Thunderbolt (filmed the same year, 1994, but released earlier in the U.S.).

The lead actress and several stunt doubles were also injured during the shooting of a motorcycle stunt, with several people suffering broken limbs and ankles.

Release
New Line Cinema acquired the film for international distribution and commissioned a new music score and English dub (with participation from Jackie Chan). A scene of Keung's airplane flying into John F. Kennedy International Airport was added to the opening credits. Three scenes were added exclusively for the international version: a shot of the syndicate's car pulling up to the diamond deal, Keung and Nancy escaping from the nightclub after the bikers spot them together, and White Tiger taking a golf shot before a subordinate approaches him with his phone. None of these scenes were in the original Hong Kong release. In comparison to the Hong Kong version, 17 minutes of cuts were made, and the new English dub changed some of the context of the characters' conversations. Keung being a cop and having a girlfriend in Hong Kong is never mentioned. Keung's father being shot by a robber years ago is also not mentioned. In the New Line Cinema edit, Elaine buys the grocery store upon her first meeting with Uncle Bill, but in the Hong Kong version, she decides to buy the market at Bill's wedding.

The new soundtrack replaced Chan's song over the closing credits with the song "Kung Fu" by the band Ash, the lyrics of which mention Jackie Chan, as well as other Asian figures and characters ubiquitous in the west.

Reception

Box office

In Hong Kong, Rumble in the Bronx broke the box office record, earning , making it the highest-grossing film in Hong Kong up until then. In China, within ten days of release, the film grossed  from  tickets sold at  each. It set a record in Guangzhou, with  grossed in the city. It became the highest-grossing imported film in China up until then, grossing . It was the year's eighth highest-grossing film in Taiwan, earning . In Japan, the film earned  at the box office. In South Korea, it was the highest-grossing film of the year, selling 941,433 tickets and earning .

The film was Chan's mainstream breakthrough in North America. When the film made its North American premiere at the Sundance Film Festival in January 1996, the film drew overwhelmingly positive reactions from large crowds cheering loudly, comparable to a sold-out concert. It eventually got a wide release in February 1996. Opening on 1,736 North American screens, it was number one at the box office in its opening weekend, grossing US$9,858,380 ($5,678 per screen). It became one of the year's top 20 highest-grossing R-rated films, finishing its North American run with $32,392,047 (equivalent to  adjusted for inflation in 2021). In the United Kingdom, the film sold 130,583 tickets and grossed . In France and Germany, the film sold 493,756 tickets. In other European countries, the film sold 460,254 tickets.

It was the most profitable film of 1996, with its US box office alone earning over 6 times its  budget.

Critical response
When released in North America, Rumble in the Bronx received generally positive reviews, with most critics happy that a Jackie Chan film was finally getting a wide theatrical release in North America. Most critics praised the action, stunts, and Chan's charm, but found the plot and acting to be lacking.

Roger Ebert gave the film a positive review, rating it 3 out of 4 stars. His review for the Chicago Sun-Times stated:
Any attempt to defend this movie on rational grounds is futile. Don't tell me about the plot and the dialogue. Don't dwell on the acting. The whole point is Jackie Chan – and, like Astaire and Rogers, he does what he does better than anybody. There is a physical confidence, a grace, an elegance to the way he moves. There is humor to the choreography of the fights (which are never too gruesome). He's having fun. If we allow ourselves to get in the right frame of mind, so are we.

Nate Jones in The Daily Utah Chronicle rated the film 3-and-a-half stars. He described Chan as "the biggest action hero in the world" like a cross between Bruce Lee, Bruce Willis, Charlie Chaplin, and Harrison Ford, and said Chan "has brought the Kung-Fu action picture" genre "roaring back to life" in American pop culture. He praised the action choreography as "a masterfully seamless wave, proving that acting and fighting can coexist, if they're in the hands of a virtuoso." However, he criticized the English dubbing.

In a 1995 review for the Hong Kong Film Critics Society, Stephen Teo panned the film as "at best, an average Jackie Chan picture." He noted that despite the final hovercraft set piece, the action "is offset by the comedy underpinnings of the thin plot."

The film was featured in a 2015 video essay by Every Frame A Painting, calling attention to the fact that the movie was shot in Vancouver despite being set in the Bronx, where no mountain ranges are visible.

Awards and nominations
 1996 Hong Kong Film Awards
 Winner: Best Action Choreography (Jackie Chan, Stanley Tong)
 Nomination: Best Actor (Jackie Chan)
 Nomination: Best Actress (Anita Mui)
 Nomination: Best Film Editing (Peter Cheung)
 Nomination: Best New Performer (Françoise Yip)
 Nomination: Best Picture (Barbie Tang)
 Nomination: Best Supporting Actress (Françoise Yip)
 1997 Key Art Awards
 Winner: Best of Show – Audiovisual  For the "Ben Knows" comedy TV spot
 1996 MTV Movie Awards
 Nomination: Best Fight (Jackie Chan)

Television
In the United Kingdom, the film was watched by  viewers on BBC1 in 2008, making it the year's most-watched foreign-language film on BBC. It was later watched by  UK viewers on BBC1 in 2009, making it the year's most-watched foreign-language film on UK television. In 2011, it was again the year's most-watched foreign-language film on UK television with 900,000 viewers on BBC1. Combined, the film drew at least  UK television viewership on BBC1 between 2008 and 2011.

Home video
The majority of DVD versions of the film contain the heavily edited US New Line Cinema cut, with the relevant dubs created for each market. However, other versions exist, which are closer to the original theatrical release.

Warner
 A DVD was produced by Warner Brothers HK for Hong Kong and South Korea. This contains the New Line Cinema version with additional abridged Cantonese and Mandarin soundtracks. It has an aspect ratio of 2.35:1, but includes no English subtitles.
 Warner Home Video also released a DVD in Japan of the Hong Kong version. This version contains the Hong Kong cut of the film. The dialogue is completely undubbed in a mono 2.0. However, its aspect ratio is cropped to 1.85:1 and contains no English subtitles.
 In Hong Kong, a VCD containing the Hong Kong version in Cantonese, with newly generated English and Chinese subtitles was also released. It's 2.35:1.
 A Blu-ray was released in the United States on 6 October 2015.

Thakral/Chinastar
It appears that a joint-distribution deal was made, with Thakral releasing the film in China, and Chinastar releasing it in Hong Kong. This version contains no credits, not even the film title,  but is otherwise the Hong Kong version. There are no English subtitles and the ratio is roughly 2.10:1.

Speedy
Malaysian distributor Speedy released a VCD. As well as local censorship (for profanity - also featuring a substituted shots of Angelo insulting Keung), it has a slightly different Cantonese/English soundtrack (some characters are dubbed in Cantonese); there are English, Chinese and Malay subtitles languages. It is cropped to approximately 1:85:1 and distorted to 1:56:1.

Funny
The film had three separate DVD releases by Taiwanese distributor Funny. Two of these DVDs feature the Taiwanese Mandarin-dubbed version with embedded subtitles. One of these contains a Dolby 5.1 soundtrack only, whilst the other contains both Dolby and DTS soundtracks. The third release is a double-sided disc, featuring the Taiwanese Mandarin dub on one side and the English-dubbed New Line Cinema version on the other. Despite containing a dubbed soundtrack, these DVDs are the only releases to contain English subtitles for a Chinese version. All three are presented in 2.35:1.

4 Film Favorites
 Another DVD was released as part of the 4 Film Favorites: Martial Arts collection. The release is exactly like the New Line Cinema version. The film is also attached to The Corruptor, Showdown in Little Tokyo, and Bloodsport.

See also

 Jackie Chan filmography
 List of Hong Kong films

References

External links
 
 

1995 films
1995 action films
1995 martial arts films
English-language Hong Kong films
Films set in New York City
Films set in the Bronx
Films shot in Vancouver
Golden Harvest films
American action comedy films
American martial arts films
Hong Kong action comedy films
Hong Kong martial arts films
Kung fu films
Martial arts comedy films
Films directed by Stanley Tong
Films scored by J. Peter Robinson
Films scored by Nathan Wang
Chinese New Year films
1990s American films
1990s English-language films
1990s Hong Kong films
Foreign films set in the United States